David Krakauer (born December 28, 1967) is an American evolutionary biologist. He is the President and William H. Miller Professor of Complex Systems at the Santa Fe Institute.

Biography
Born in Hawaii, Krakauer grew up in southern Portugal and moved to London, England, for secondary school.

He attended Royal Holloway University of London, where he earned degrees in computer science and mathematics. He received his D.Phil. in evolutionary theory from Oxford University in 1995, where he stayed on as a postdoctoral research fellow.

Career
Since 2015, Krakauer has served as the President and William H. Miller Professor of Complex Systems at the Santa Fe Institute. Krakauer previously served as the institute's faculty chair and as a resident professor and an external professor. He also co-directs the Collective Computation Group (C4) at the Santa Fe Institute.

At the University of Wisconsin, Madison, Krakauer served as the founding director of the Wisconsin Institute for Discovery, the Co-director of the Center for Complexity and Collective Computation, and as a professor of mathematical genetics.

Krakauer has also held positions as a visiting fellow at the Genomics Frontiers Institute at the University of Pennsylvania, a Sage Fellow at the Sage Center for the Study of the Mind at the University of California, Santa Barbara, a long-term Fellow of the Institute for Advanced Study in Princeton, and visiting Professor of Evolution at Princeton University.

In 2012, Krakauer was included in the Wired Magazine Smart List as one of fifty people "who will change the world."

References

External links
 
 "Complexity and Stupidity" interview with Sam Harris on the Waking Up podcast
 "Laziness, Technology and Brain Scanning a Billion People: A Conversation with David Krakauer" interview with Robert Wolcott for Forbes
 "John and David Krakauer" profile in Current Biology
 "How Your Leadership Skills Will Determine Your Company Culture"  article in Entrepreneur
 "Take Me to the Limit" interview with Mary-Charlotte Domandi on Science Radio Cafe
 "The Roots of Technological Singularity Can Be Traced Back to the Stone Age" editorial in Wired UK
 "Never Mind Turing Tests. What About Terminator Tests?" editorial in The Chronicle of Higher Education

21st-century American biologists
Alumni of the University of Oxford
1967 births
Living people
Santa Fe Institute people
Scientists from Hawaii
Evolutionary biologists
Alumni of the University of London
University of Wisconsin–Madison faculty